This is a list of global law firms ranked by profits per equity partner (PPEP) in 2021. Firms marked with "(verein)" are structured as a Swiss association.

These are estimates and equity partners can make vastly different salaries inside the same firm.

See also
List of largest law firms by revenue
List of largest United States-based law firms by profits per partner
List of largest United Kingdom-based law firms by revenue
List of largest Canada-based law firms by revenue
List of largest Europe-based law firms by revenue
List of largest Japan-based law firms by head count
List of largest China-based law firms by revenue

References 

Profit